The 1989 Transnistrian census was organized by the authorities of the MSSR in the final days of its existence as a Soviet republic. It took place as part of the Soviet Census of 1989.

Results from the 1989 census showed that among the population of Transnistria, approximately 40% were ethnic Moldovans, 28% Ukrainians and 25% Russians.

Census results 

 Total population on the left bank of the Dniester river (minus Tighina): 546,400
 Total population in raions mostly on the left bank of the Dniester river (minus Tighina): 601,660
 (note that percentages below are given from the second figure)
 Moldovans: 39.9% 
 Ukrainians: 28.3%
 Russians: 25.5%
 Others: 6.4%

See also 
 2004 Transnistrian census
 2015 Transnistrian census
 Demographic history of Transnistria

References 

Censuses in Transnistria
Transnistria
1989 in Transnistria
Transnistria